This is a list of U.S. law enforcement officers killed in the line of duty. Summaries of the overall casualty figures, by year, are also provided.

Overview by year 
According to the FBI, which publishes the data in the Uniform Crime Reports, from 1980 to 2014, an average of 64 law enforcement officers were feloniously killed per year. Those killed in accidents in the line of duty are not included in that number.

2010 
The Officer Down Memorial Page reports 180 deaths in the line of duty. The average from 1990 to 2010 was 164 per year.

2011 
The Officer Down Memorial Page reports 187 deaths in the line of duty. The FBI reported that in 2011, "69 law enforcement officers from around the nation were killed in the line of duty, while another 53 officers died in accidents while performing their duties." (released November 19, 2012) NBC News reported 165 dead.

2012 
The Officer Down Memorial Page reports 141 deaths in the line of duty. For 2012, the FBI records 49 deaths in the line of duty. The FBI Fund counted 49 federal, state and local officers to have been killed in 2012.

2013 
The Officer Down Memorial Page reports 128 deaths in the line of duty. The National Law Enforcement Officers Memorial Fund counted 102 federal, state and local officers to have been killed in 2012.
The official count from the FBI is that 27 law enforcement officers were 'feloniously' killed in the line of duty in 2013 (the lowest in a 35-year period 1980–2014), and an additional 49 died in accidents (total: 76).

2014 
The Officer Down Memorial Page reports 158 deaths in the line of duty. The National Law Enforcement Officers Memorial Fund counted 126 federal, state, local, tribal and territorial officers killed. The preliminary count from the FBI is that 51 law enforcement officers were 'feloniously' killed in the line of duty in 2014, and an additional 44 died in accidents (total: 95).

2015 
The Officer Down Memorial Page reports 164 deaths in the line of duty. The National Law Enforcement Officers Memorial Fund counted 124 federal, state, local, tribal and territorial officers killed. Forty-two officers were shot and killed and 52 officers were killed in traffic-related incidents.

2016 
The Officer Down Memorial Page reports 171 deaths in the line of duty. The National Law Enforcement Officers Memorial Fund counted 135 federal, state, local, tribal and territorial officers killed. Sixty-four officers were shot and killed and 21 were ambushed.

2017 
The Officer Down Memorial Page reports 152 deaths in the line of duty. The National Law Enforcement Officers Memorial Fund counted 128 federal, state, local, tribal and territorial officers killed. Fatalities decreased more than 10 percent with traffic-related fatalities the leading cause this year. Firearms-related fatalities were the second-leading cause of officer deaths, with 44 officers shot and killed in 2017. This represents a 33 percent decrease from the 66 officers killed in firearm-related incidents during 2016.

2018 
The Officer Down Memorial Page reports 150 deaths in the line of duty. The National Law Enforcement Officers Memorial Fund counted 144 federal, state, local, tribal and territorial officers killed. The FBI, however, reported 106 deaths in the line of duty. Firearms-related fatalities were the leading cause of officer deaths for the year.

2019 
The Officer Down Memorial Page reports 150 deaths in the line of duty. The leading cause of death for 2019 was gunfire at 49 deaths followed by 9/11-related cancers at 24 deaths. The state with the highest number of line-of-duty deaths was New York with 25 followed by Texas with 18.

2020 
The Officer Down Memorial Page reports 436 deaths in the line of duty. The leading cause of death for 2020 was COVID-19 at 281 deaths followed by gunfire at 46 deaths and 9/11-related cancers with 35 deaths. The state with the largest number of line-of-duty deaths was Texas with 78 followed by New York with 43.

2021 
The Officer Down Memorial Page reports 633 deaths in the line of duty. The leading cause of death for 2021 was COVID-19 at 454 deaths followed by gunfire at 64 deaths. Fifty-eight officers died in vehicle-related deaths (vehicular homicide, struck by vehicle while on-duty, automobile crash during pursuit). The state with the highest number of line-of-duty deaths was Texas with 107 followed by Florida with 60.

2022 
The Officer Down Memorial Page reports 230 deaths in the line of duty. The leading cause of death for 2022 was COVID-19 at 74 deaths followed by gunfire at 60 deaths. The state with the highest number of line-of-duty deaths was Texas with 33.

Lists of officers killed

 This list does not include deaths due to the 9/11 attacks; those deaths are listed here.
 Tip: If you need all of the tables expanded, it is easiest to expand them from the bottom to the top.

Prior to 2010

2010

2011

2012

2013

2014

2015

2016

2017

2018

2019

2020

2021

2022

Gallery

See also 

Law enforcement in the United States

Incidents with multiple deaths 
2022 shooting of Kentucky police officers
2018 murders of Eric Joering and Anthony Morelli
2016 shooting of Baton Rouge police officers
2016 shooting of Dallas police officers
2016 shootings of Des Moines police officers 
2014 killings of NYPD officers
2014 shooting of Sacramento police officers
2014 Las Vegas shootings
2014 Alaska State Trooper killings
2013 shooting of Santa Cruz police officers
2009 shooting of Lakewood, Washington, police officers
2009 shooting of Pittsburgh police officers
2009 shootings of Oakland police officers
1995 Oklahoma City bombing
1993 Waco siege
1972–1973 Mark Essex shootings
1971 shooting of Dallas police officers
1970 Newhall incident
1950 Utuado uprising
1932 Young Brothers massacre
1917 Milwaukee Police Department bombing
1902 Will Reynolds shootings

Other nations 
List of Australian Federal Police killed in the line of duty
List of British police officers killed in the line of duty
List of Irish police officers killed in the line of duty
List of Malaysian police officers killed in the line of duty
List of New Zealand police officers killed in the line of duty
List of Singapore police officers killed in the line of duty

Killings by law enforcement 
List of killings by law enforcement officers in the United States
List of law enforcement officers convicted for an on-duty killing in the United States

Notes

References

External links 
 Officer Down Memorial Page (ODMP)

Death in the United States-related lists
United States crime-related lists
Lists of police officers killed in the line of duty